Carlo Ignazio Monza (c. 1680 – 9 May 1739) was an Italian composer. He was born in Milan and died in Vercelli. Works of his were possibly among the music that formed the basis for the Pulcinella score by Igor Stravinsky. There are recordings of Monza's harpsichord music by Terence Charlston.

External links
Works by Monza

Italian male classical composers
Italian Baroque composers
17th-century births
1739 deaths
18th-century Italian composers
18th-century Italian male musicians